Andhi Nirwanto (born in Kudus, Central Java on 8 January 1956) is a former Attorney General of Indonesia from October 2014 to November 2014. Andhi was appointed Deputy Attorney General by President Susilo Bambang Yudhoyono on 19 November 2013 to replace the retiring Darmono.

References

1956 births
Living people
Attorneys General of Indonesia
21st-century Indonesian lawyers
People from Java